Nathan Sacks is a former South African professional football (soccer) player who spent one season in the North American Soccer League.

Professional
In 1981, Sacks signed with the Dallas Tornado of the North American Soccer League.  In the fall of 1981, he moved to the Pittsburgh Spirit of the Major Indoor Soccer League.  In 1984, Sacks played for the Houston Dynamos in the United Soccer League.  In the fall of 1983, he signed with the Los Angeles Lazers of the Major Indoor Soccer League.  He would play three seasons with the Lazers.  In 1986, he played for the Los Angeles Heat in the Western Soccer Alliance.  That fall, he signed with the Tampa Bay Rowdies of the American Indoor Soccer Association.  He returned to the Heat for the 1989 and 1990 seasons.

References

External links
 
 NASL/MISL stats

1951 births
Soccer players from Pretoria
South African soccer players
South African expatriate soccer players
American Indoor Soccer Association players
American Professional Soccer League players
Expatriate footballers in Israel
Bnei Yehuda Tel Aviv F.C. players
Dallas Tornado players
Houston Dynamos players
Jewish footballers
Living people
Los Angeles Heat players
Major Indoor Soccer League (1978–1992) players
National Professional Soccer League (1984–2001) players
North American Soccer League (1968–1984) players
Pittsburgh Spirit players
Tampa Bay Rowdies (1975–1993) players
South African emigrants to Israel
South African Jews
United Soccer League (1984–85) players
Western Soccer Alliance players
Expatriate soccer players in the United States
South African expatriate sportspeople in the United States
Association football midfielders